Miniplex Channel is a Hindi movies channel by Shemaroo Entertainment Network.

References

External links
Official Website of miniplex

Television stations in Mumbai
Hindi-language television stations
Hindi-language television channels in India
Television channels and stations established in 2016